Tadeu Souza Terra (born October 30, 1986 in Rio de Janeiro) is a Brazilian footballer who is currently without a club.

Career

College and amateur
Terra came to the United States from his native Brazil in 2006 after being offered a college soccer scholarship by St. John's University in New York. He played in all 22 games for the Red Storm in his freshman season, ranking second on the team in assists and points, but was forced to sit out the 2007 as a medical redshirt after suffering an injury in pre-season. He returned to the field in 2008, earning third team NSCAA All-Northeast Region honors and an All-BIG EAST honorable mention, and was second team All-BIG EAST selection in his junior year in 2009. In 2010 Terra was a first team ALL-BIG EAST selection, and he finished his collegiate career with 16 goals and 15 assists.

During his college years Terra also played three seasons with the Long Island Rough Riders in the USL Premier Development League.

Professional
Terra signed his first professional contract in 2011 when he was signed by F.C. New York of the USL Professional Division. He made his professional debut on April 9, 2011 in New York's first-ever game, a 3-0 loss to Orlando City. Also in 2011, Terra led the USL Pro League in assists, and he was finalist for the USL Pro "Rookie of the Year" award.

At the end of the 2011 USL Pro season Terra signed a loan deal with Finnish club MyPa, which plays in the Veikkausliiga.

References

External links
 St. Johns profile

1986 births
Living people
Brazilian footballers
Brazilian expatriate footballers
St. John's Red Storm men's soccer players
Long Island Rough Riders players
F.C. New York players
Myllykosken Pallo −47 players
Expatriate soccer players in the United States
Expatriate footballers in Finland
USL League Two players
USL Championship players
Veikkausliiga players
Association football midfielders
Sportspeople from Niterói